Shiva Temple is a  summit located in the Grand Canyon, in Coconino County of Arizona, US. Shiva Temple is named for Shiva, the Hindu deity, destroyer of the universe. This name was applied by Clarence Dutton who began the tradition of naming geographical features in the Grand Canyon after mythological deities. Dutton believed Shiva Temple was the largest, grandest, and most majestic of the Grand Canyon buttes, with a broad, level, forested top. This mountain's name was officially adopted in 1906 by the U.S. Board on Geographic Names.

In 1937, the American Museum of Natural History led explorations to Shiva Temple and Wotans Throne in the belief that these buttes, isolated for 100,000 years from the plateau, may have evolved new species. The scientists discovered Ancestral Puebloan dwellings, deer antlers, and an empty Kodak film box that had been left behind a month earlier by pioneer Emery Kolb, his daughter Edith, Ruth Stephens Baker, Gordon Berger, and Ralph White, but no new species.

According to the Köppen climate classification system, Shiva Temple has a Cold semi-arid climate.

Geology

The top of Shiva Temple is composed of Permian Kaibab Limestone overlaying cream-colored, cliff-forming, Permian Coconino Sandstone. The conspicuous band of sandstone, which is the third-youngest strata in the Grand Canyon, was deposited 265 million years ago as sand dunes. Below the Coconino Sandstone is slope-forming, reddish terraces of the Pennsylvanian-Permian Supai Group. Further down are strata of Mississippian Redwall Limestone, and finally the Cambrian Tonto Group. Precipitation runoff from Shiva Temple drains south to the Colorado River via Trinity and Crystal Creeks.

Prominence – A plateau/tableland

The tableland plateau of Shiva Temple's prominence is made up of a forest of Ponderosa Pine; also pines, junipers, shrubs, and cacti. The animals found in the survey expedition of 1937 were chipmunks, cottontail rabbits, pack rats, mice species, and rock squirrels.

Gallery

See also
 Geology of the Grand Canyon area

References

External links 

 Weather forecast: National Weather Service
 American Museum of Natural History Grand Canyon Expedition account: American Alpine Journal
 Shiva Temple aerial photo

Grand Canyon
Landforms of Coconino County, Arizona
Mountains of Arizona
Mountains of Coconino County, Arizona
North American 2000 m summits
Colorado Plateau
Grand Canyon National Park
Sandstone formations of the United States